Democratic Party of Zagorje ( or ZDS) is a right-wing political party from Krapina-Zagorje and Varaždin counties in Croatia. Members: 1998 (5,250), 1999 (5,250), 2002 (5,500).

ZDS was established on 5 February 1997 in Oroslavje.

At the 2003 parliamentary elections, an alliance of the Croatian Party of Rights (Hrvatska stranka prava, HSP), the Međimurje Party (Međimurska stranka) and the Zagorje Democratic Party won 6.4% of votes and 8 out of 151 seats. The seats were all allocated to HSP.

At the last local elections in Croatia in 2005, an alliance of the ZDS and HSLS won 10% of votes in Krapina-Zagorje County and 5 seats out of 51 in Regional Parliament.
An alliance of the ZDS and its partners won elections in the towns of Klanjec and Donja Stubica and municipalities of Desinić, Budinščina, Krapinske Toplice and Tuhelj.

A regional party from Zagorje County (north of Zagreb) and Varaždin County. This party has not a single representative in the Parliament, but the State Election Committee and the Parliamentary Constitutional Committee decided that it is to be counted as a parliamentary party. Namely, the party run for election in 2004 in joint list with the HSP and they together won one seat that is occupied by a non-party representative.

President elected on general assembly in 2006 is doctor Stanko Belina from Zabok, Croatia. Elected vice presidents are: doctor Viseslav Cuk, Dragutin Burek, Darko Potocki, Dragutin Babic and Zeljko Belina. Secretary General of the Party is Zvonko Zupanic. 
On the last local elections ZDS won five seats in Regional Parliament together with HSLS (coalition ZDS-HSLS). 
Policy of ZDS is promotion of ecology - primary anti-GMO actions, protection of water supplies in Zagorje and North-West Croatia as well as protection of general interests of Zagorje and Varaždin County citizens.

In 2016, ZDS changed its name to Croatian Kajkavian Party, looking to expand its influence into 11 Croatian counties where Kajkavian is spoken, but reverted to its original name a year later.

Electoral history

Legislative

References

External links
 

Political parties established in 1997
Regionalist parties in Croatia
1997 establishments in Croatia
Right-wing parties in Europe